Mani Chandra Thapa is a Nepalese politician and former Minister of Water Supply  of Government Of Nepal.

See also 

 2021 split in Communist Party of Nepal (Maoist Centre)

References 

Government ministers of Nepal
Communist Party of Nepal (Unified Marxist–Leninist) politicians
Nepal Communist Party (NCP) politicians
Living people
Year of birth missing (living people)